Until September is a 1984 romantic drama film directed by Richard Marquand and starring Karen Allen and Thierry Lhermitte. The plot concerns an American tourist and a French banker who fall in love in Paris.

Plot
Moe Alexander (Karen Allen) is an American tourist in Paris. When she misses her plane home, she ends up being stuck in Paris for a while until her visa gets approved and goes to stay at the apartment of a friend who is away for the summer. There she meets Xavier de la Perouse (Thierry Lhermitte), a wealthy French banker. Xavier is married but his wife and family are away. As he spends time with Moe, their mutual attraction is overwhelming and they fall in love.

Cast

Production 
Janice Lee Graham wrote the screenplay based on the eleven years she lived in Paris. After being hired as a secretary for 20th Century Fox executive Edward S. Feldman she sold the script to Michael Gruskoff in 1982. Principal photography began on July 18, 1983, in Paris.

Reception
Until September earned $4,239,154 from its brief theatrical run in North America. It debuted in sixth place for its opening weekend.

References

External links

1984 films
1984 romantic drama films
United Artists films
Films directed by Richard Marquand
Films scored by John Barry (composer)
American romantic drama films
Metro-Goldwyn-Mayer films
Films shot in Paris
Films set in Paris
1980s English-language films
1980s American films